Lurdes Breda is a Portuguese poet and children's writer.

Biography
Lurdes Breda was born at 1970, in the municipality of Montemor-o-Velho, Portugal. She attended the Modern Languages and Literatures course – Portuguese Studies variant, at the Open University. She was awarded in several national and international literary contests. Breda is the author of twenty-eight works and co-author of eleven others, published in Portugal, Brazil and Mozambique. She is known, above all, as a writer of books for children and young people.

Awards and honours
In 2005, Lurdes was distinguished with the "Women of Value" Award and in 2014, she received the Municipal Cultural Merit Medal.

Bibliography

Fiction
 "O Misterioso Falcão de Jalne" (Edition: Mar da Palavra, November 2004)

Poetry
 "Asas de Vento e Sal" (Edition: Mar da Palavra, March 2006)
 "A Outra Face do Luar" (Illustration by Ana Loureiro), (Edition: Mar da Palavra, December 2006) 
 "Para Ti, Pai" (Illustration by André Caetano), (Edition: Gatafunho, March 2011)
 "Para Ti, Mãe" (Illustration by André Caetano), (Edition: Gatafunho, April 2011)
 "Lua em Flor" (Illustration by Ana Luísa Kaminski (cover) and André Caetano), (Edition: Vieira da Silva, August 2012)

Children and Youth
 "Zuleida, A Princesa Moura" (Illustration by Andreia Travassos), (Edition: Mar da Palavra, January, 2006) 
 "O Abade João" (Illustration by André Caetano), (Edition: Minerva Coimbra, June 2009) 
 "O Duende Barnabé e as Cores Mágicas" (Illustration by Joana Rita, Music by Nuno Mouronho and Lina Carregã), (Edition: Nova Educação, December 2009)
 "O Piolho Zarolho e o Arco-íris" (Illustration by Carla Figueiredo), (Edition: Temas Originais, March 2010)
 "O Alfabeto Trapalhão" (Illustration by Rute Reimão), (Edition: Gatafunho, October 2010)
 "O Rap do Mar e Outros Contos de Rimar" (Illustration by Aurélio Mesquita) (Edition: Lugar da Palavra, March 2011)
 "O Duende Barnabé e o Jogo Geométrico" (Illustration by Joana Rita, Music by Nuno Mouronho and Lina Carregã), (Edition: Nova Educação, May 2006)
 "O Relógio que tem a Barriga a dar Horas" (Illustration by Manuela Câmara), (Edition: Edições Esgotadas, January 2012) 
 "O Livro Sem Letras" (Illustration by Inês Pereira), (Edition: Chiado Books, December 2012)
 "À Roda do Coração" (Illustration by Cátia Vidinhas), (Edition: Paleta de Letras, December 2013)
 "O Menino Quatro-Olhos e o Pássaro Azul" (Illustration by Mafalda Barata), (Edition: Lugar da Palavra, November 2014) 
 "Afonso" (Illustration by Marta Jacinto) (Edition: Author, October 2016)
 "A Avó que sonhava o mar" (Illustration by Joana Rita), (Edition: Textiverso, May 2017)
 "A Nuvem que chovia Peixes" (Illustration and design by Manuela Rocha), (Edition: Textiverso, June 2017)
 "Bichofonias – Contos com bichos dentro" (Illustration by Marta Jacinto, pedagogical review by Joana Rama), (Edition: Textiverso, July 2017)
 "Onde moram as estrelas / Donde viven las estrellas" (Illustration by Alejandra Giordano (Alita)), (Edition: Hora de Ler, May 2019) 
 "A Árvore Mágica" (Illustration by Roberto Chichorro), (Edition: Escola Portuguesa de Moçambique – Centro de Ensino e Língua Portuguesa (EPM-CELP), May 2019) 
 "O Gafanhoto Saltarico" (Illustration by Carla Monteiro), (Edition: Hora de Ler, November 2019) 
 "100 Papas na Língua" (Illustration by Tânia Clímaco), (Edition: Escola Portuguesa de Moçambique – Centro de Ensino e Língua Portuguesa (EPM-CELP) e Camões – Centro Cultural de Maputo, May 2020) 
 "Henriqueta e o Bruxedo da Lua" (Illustration by Manuela Rocha), (Edition: Hora de Ler, July 2020)

References

External links
 Official website
 Presentation of the book "100 Papas na Língua"
 Interview to "Mar de Letras" TV Programme, RTP Africa
 Participation in the monthly rubric "Tempo de Autor" of the Library Lúcio Craveiro da Silva

1970 births
Living people
People from Montemor-o-Velho
21st-century Portuguese women writers
Portuguese writers
Portuguese children's writers
21st-century Portuguese writers